Aulonemia fimbriatifolia is a species of bamboo in the genus Aulonemia. 
The species is part of the grass family and is endemic to Latin America.

References

fimbriatifolia